No. 299 Squadron was a Royal Air Force squadron during the Second World War and was part of No. 38 Group.

History

No. 299 Squadron was formed on 4 November 1943 form 'C' flight of 297 Squadron at RAF Stoney Cross, Hampshire as a special operations squadron. It became operational in April 1944 dropping SOE agents. During the Normandy landing the squadron first delivered paratroopers, and then returned to air-tow 16 Airspeed Horsa gliders across the English Channel. The squadron continued operations with resupply drops until 10 June when it returned to SOE duties.
In between the SOE duties the squadron air-towed Horsa gliders for the Arnhem landing (Operation Market Garden), and the Rhine crossing (Operation Varsity). It was also involved in supply-dropping to resistance forces in Norway until the end of the war. On 7 October 1945, it lost five of its members in the crash of a Short Stirling IV in Rennes (Brittany).
At the end of the Second World War the squadron disbanded at RAF Shepherds Grove, Suffolk on 15 February 1946.

Aircraft operated

Squadron bases

Commanding officers

See also
 No. 38 Group RAF
 List of Royal Air Force aircraft squadrons

References

Notes

Bibliography

External links

 299 squadron page at 38 group site
 299 squadron at MOD site
 squadron histories for nos. 296–299 squadron at RAFWeb's Air of Authority – A History of RAF Organisation

Special Operations Executive
Military units and formations established in 1943
No. 299
299 Squadron
Military units and formations disestablished in 1946